Mindia Matidia or Vibia Matidia or Matidia Minor (Minor Latin for the younger, 85 – after 161) was a Roman imperial woman in the early second century AD. She was related to several ancient Roman Emperors, as a great-niece to Trajan and half-sister to Vibia Sabina, who was the wife of Hadrian. The modern village of Matigge, Italy, is perhaps named after her.

Family

Matidia Minor was the daughter of Salonia Matidia from her second marriage to the otherwise unattested Roman aristocrat Lucius Mindius. Her mother Salonia Matidia was the daughter of Ulpia Marciana, sister of Roman emperor Trajan, and therefore was a niece of the emperor. Matidia Minor's half-sister Vibia Sabina was to become empress and wife of the Roman emperor Hadrian. Hadrian was also her third cousin.

Life

After her father's death in 85, Matidia along with her half-sisters lived with their grandmother and mother and were raised in the household of Trajan, his wife Plotina and her stepfather. Matidia Minor never received the title of Augusta and there is little evidence of her involvement in the state affairs. Her husband or children, if they ever existed, did not register in historical records, and she remained single for the rest of her life (which was unusual at the time).

Trajan gave her a villa where modern Matigge, Italy is now located. Due to this villa, the city became known in Latin as Insula Matidiae (modern Matigge, Italy). Matidia became competent in her affairs and when her sister became empress, she would often travel with her and her brother-in-law.

Patron

During the time she was single, she was in full control of her wealth, part of which she distributed as a benefaction. Her involvement in euergetism yielded inscriptions thanking her across different parts of the empire, mostly during the reign of Antoninus Pius.

Excavations in the area of Sessa Aurunca showed that Matidia was a major benefactress in the city, attesting her wealth, culture and influence. Matidia underwrote the restoration of the theatre of Sessa Aurunca which was probably damaged by an earthquake during the rule of emperor Antoninus Pius (138-161). Her generosity was commemorated with a statue and inscriptions in the theatre.

Later life and death

Matidia lived to an advanced age and outlived most of her relatives. In her later years, she was very close to her great-nephew, the future emperor Marcus Aurelius, and his family. Marcus Aurelius would sometimes allow his daughters to stay with his great-aunt.

Matidia, like many other childless women, "attracted a number of hangers-on who hoped to be remembered in her will". On her deathbed, they sealed her codicils (additions to her will) assuring their validity and ensuring that they would inherit some of her substantial estate. From her will, various family members and associates received a million sesterces (an ancient Roman unit of currency), her estate, and various other items she had. The administrator of the estate was the empress Faustina the Younger.

References

External links

 Marble bust of Matidia Minor
 https://web.archive.org/web/20060511073315/http://www.comunemonteargentario.it/english/history.htm

2nd-century Roman women
Nerva–Antonine dynasty
85 births
2nd-century deaths